Jefferson Township is a township in Harrison County, in the U.S. state of Missouri.

Jefferson Township was established in about 1845, taking its name from Thomas Jefferson, third President of the United States.

References

Townships in Missouri
Townships in Harrison County, Missouri